Charles Stuart Tobin (November 24, 1885 – May 30, 1924) was a Canadian professional ice hockey player. Tobin played 175 games in various professional and amateur leagues, including the Pacific Coast Hockey Association (PCHA). Amongst the PCHA teams he played for were the New Westminster Royals, Portland Rosebuds, Seattle Metropolitans, Vancouver Millionaires and Victoria Cougars.

Personal life
Tobin was born in Winnipeg, Manitoba. He died in 1924 at St. Vincent's Hospital in Portland, Oregon after illness due to ulcers of the stomach.

Playing career
Tobin first played senior-level ice hockey with the Edmonton Thistles in 1904–05. Starting in 1906, Tobin played for several teams in early western Canada professional leagues, such as Battleford of the Alberta Professional League, Winnipeg Monarchs, Winnipeg Shamrocks and Winnipeg Hockey Club of the Manitoba leagues, Prince Albert, Saskatoon and Moose Jaw of the Saskatchewan Professional League.

Hockey on the Canadian Prairies was often strenuous due to the weather and the physical nature of the game, and once, while Tobin was playing with North Battleford in the city of Battleford, the temperature was so low that the players had to use alcohol rubs to fight off frostbite. And in December 1907, while playing for the Winnipeg Hockey Club in a qualifying test game, he was assaulted by Joe Hall in a particularly rough contest and had to be carried off the ice.

In 1912, the new PCHA was formed and Tobin joined the league in its second season, in 1912–13, playing for the New Westminster Royals. Tobin would play the bulk of his career in the PCHA, playing with the Portland Rosebuds, Victoria Aristocrats, Seattle Metropolitans and Vancouver Millionaires. Several of the teams were PCHA champions and Tobin played in the 1916, 1920 and 1922 Stanley Cup finals with the Rosebuds, Metropolitans and Millionaires, but did not play for a Stanley Cup champion, losing in the fifth and deciding game all three times.

Statistics

References

External links

1885 births
1924 deaths
Canadian ice hockey right wingers
New Westminster Royals players
Portland Rosebuds players
Seattle Metropolitans players
Ice hockey people from Winnipeg
Vancouver Millionaires players
Victoria Aristocrats players
Winnipeg Hockey Club players